Cortese is a surname of Italian origin.  It may refer to:
Anthony Cortese (b. 1947), US environmental scientist
Bob Cortese (b. 1943), US college football coach
Cristoforo Cortese (–1445), Venetian miniaturist and illuminator
Dan Cortese (b. 1967), US actor
David D. Cortese (b. 1956), US political figure (Santa Clara County, California Supervisor)
Deena Cortese (b. 1987), American television personality, Jersey Shore
Domenico Tarcisio Cortese (1931-2011), Roman Catholic Bishop of Mileto-Nicotera-Tropea
Dominic L. Cortese (b. 1932), US political figure (California state legislator 1980–96)
Domenico Tarcisio Cortese (1931–2011), Roman Catholic bishop of Mileto-Nicotera-Tropea
Enrico Cortese (b. 1985), Italian footballer
Federico Cortese, music director of the Boston Youth Symphony Orchestras and nconductor of the Harvard-Radcliffe Orchestra 
Franco Cortese (1903–1986), Italian auto racing driver
Genevieve Cortese (b. 1981), US television actress
Giovanni Andrea Cortese (1483–1548), Italian cardinal and monastic reformer
Giulio Cesare Cortese (1570–1640), Italian writer
Guillaume Courtois (1628–1679), French-born artist who flourished in Rome, where he was known as Guglielmo Cortese
Isabella Cortese (fl. 1561), Italian alchemist and writer of the Renaissance
Joe Cortese (b. 1948), US actor
Laura Cortese (f. 1990s–2000s), US musician
Leonardo Cortese (1916–1984), Italian film actor and director
Leone Cortese (died 1496), Roman Catholic prelate, Bishop of Acerra
Matias Cortese (born 1985), Argentine rugby union player
Nicola Cortese (born 1968), Italian banker
Nicolò Cortese (1907-1934), Roman Catholic parish priest and director for the Il Messaggero di Sant'Antonio magazine in Padua before and during World War II, Servant of God 
Pete Cortese (f. 1990s–2000s), US musician
Sandro Cortese (b. 1990), German motorcycle racer
Shane Cortese (b. 1968), New Zealand actor and singer
Valentina Cortese (1923–2019), Italian actress

See also 
 Cortesi (disambiguation)
 Cortes (surname)
 Cortese List, Californian planning document about the location of hazardous materials release sites

Italian-language surnames